The Rifriscolaro, Sicilian Il Rifriscolaro, anciently called the Oanis ), is an arroyo in south-east Sicily.

It rises a kilometre north of Donnafugata Castle, in the Ragusan countryside and flowing with an east–west orientation through the commune of Ragusa. After a course of around eleven kilometres  it flows into the Mediterranean Sea, south of the ruined Greek city of Kamarina but the flow has a negative hydraulic balance and carries almost no water for the majority of the year. In the valley of the Rifriscolaro there are a number of diverse archaeological remains, which include the ruins of a temple of Demeter and a necropolis with graves dating to the Archaic Greek period (sixth century BCE) to the Hellenistic period (third century BCE).

Rivers of Sicily
Rivers of the Province of Ragusa
Rivers of Italy